AFL Game Day was an Australian television program broadcast on the Seven Network in Victoria, South Australia, Western Australia and Tasmania and on 7mate in all other states. In Victoria, South Australia, Western Australia and Tasmania it aired following Weekend Sunrise.

The program focused on the current issues in the Australian Football League. It first aired on 16 March 2008 and aired at 10am on Sundays throughout the AFL season.

History 
The weekly program was hosted by Hamish McLachlan and had regular guests such as Leigh Matthews, Mark Stevens, Jude Bolton, Cameron Ling or Jimmy Bartel. Several current players or coaches also appeared each week. The program was extended to 90 minutes in 2012, finishing at 11:30 am, meaning the last half-hour went head to head with the Nine Network's The Sunday Footy Show.

During the 2010 AFL finals series, the program was also broadcast on Thursday nights at 7:30 pm. A special Saturday morning edition has aired on the day of the Grand Final since 2012.

In March 2020, the program revealed a brand new set and graphics. However, in June 2020, the program was axed due to the effects of the coronavirus pandemic.

Nat Edwards was the main fill-in presenter for McLachlan.

Host & panelists

Host 
 Hamish McLachlan

Panelists 
 Leigh Matthews
 Jude Bolton 
 Cameron Ling 
 Mark Stevens 
 Nick Maxwell 
 Jimmy Bartel
 Daisy Pearce
 Kathleen Pettyfor (Injury Updates)
 Nat Edwards (News Updates)

Former panelists 
 Mark Robinson 
 Tom Harley
 Jon Anderson
 Matthew Richardson
 David Schwarz
 Mark Ricciuto
 Peter Larkins

See also

 List of Australian television series
 List of longest-running Australian television series

References

External links
 
 

Seven Network original programming
Television shows set in Melbourne
Australian rules football television series
2008 Australian television series debuts
2020 Australian television series endings
2010s Australian television series
English-language television shows
Seven Sport